UFC 198: Werdum vs. Miocic was a mixed martial arts event held on May 14, 2016, at Arena da Baixada in Curitiba, Brazil.

Background
The event was initially announced as a Fight Night event with a middleweight bout between former UFC Light Heavyweight Champion Vitor Belfort and former Strikeforce Middleweight Champion Ronaldo Souza scheduled to serve as headliner. However, it was reported by Brazilian media that this event would become UFC 198 following a series of events in January 2016 that led to the originally planned UFC 196 becoming a UFC Fight Night following a series of cancellations.

On March 4, it was confirmed that the event was indeed changed to PPV and it would be headlined by a UFC Heavyweight Championship bout between champion Fabrício Werdum and top contender Stipe Miocic. They were briefly scheduled to meet at the original UFC 196, as Miocic replaced former two-time champion Cain Velasquez. In turn, Werdum announced on the following day that he was pulling out of the event due to injury as well as he wasn't comfortable with the opponent change while dealing with injuries of his own.

The event was the first that the promotion hosted in Curitiba. It was the fourth stadium venue to host a UFC event after UFC 129 at the Rogers Centre in Canada, UFC on Fox: Gustafsson vs. Johnson at the Tele2 Arena in Sweden and UFC 193 at the Etihad Stadium in Australia.

A lightweight bout between Evan Dunham and The Ultimate Fighter: Brazil 2 winner Leonardo Santos, originally scheduled for this event, was moved to UFC 199 after a minor injury to Dunham delayed the matchup a few weeks.

The event featured the long anticipated debut of Curitiba native Cris Cyborg, former Strikeforce Women's Featherweight Champion and current Invicta FC Featherweight Champion, in a catchweight bout of 140 lb against Leslie Smith.

Kamaru Usman was expected to face Sérgio Moraes at the event. However, he pulled out two weeks before the event due to injury and was replaced by promotional newcomer Luan Chagas.

Former UFC Middleweight Champion Anderson Silva was expected to face Uriah Hall at the event. However, Silva pulled out just four days before the event with a clinical condition that indicated acute cholecystitis and required surgical intervention. The UFC wanted to find a replacement for him, but Hall opted against that.

During the main card broadcast, the UFC announced that former interim UFC Heavyweight Champion and Pride Heavyweight Champion Antônio Rodrigo Nogueira would be inducted to the UFC's Hall of Fame at the "International Fight Week" in July, one day after UFC 200.

Results

Bonus awards
The following fighters were awarded $50,000 bonuses:
Fight of the Night: Francisco Trinaldo vs. Yancy Medeiros
Performance of the Night: Stipe Miocic and Ronaldo Souza

See also
List of UFC events
2016 in UFC

References

Ultimate Fighting Championship events
2016 in mixed martial arts
Mixed martial arts in Brazil
2016 in Brazilian sport
Sport in Curitiba
May 2016 sports events in South America
21st century in Curitiba